The siege of Visegrád was fought between the forces of the Holy Roman Empire and the Ottoman Empire as part of the Great Turkish War. The Holy Roman Empire, led by Charles V, Duke of Lorraine captured the castle of Visegrád after a three-day siege.

Prelude
The Hungarian campaign of 1684 began on 20 May when Charles V, Duke of Lorraine's Imperial force of 43,000 men under moved out from its base at the town of Šaľa on the river Váh, marching in disparate columns down the Danube's banks to undertake the conquest of Buda. The route along the southern bank contained the Ottoman castle of Visegrád.

Siege
Lorraine started the siege of Visegrád on 15 June with an artillery bombardment. On 17 June, he demanded the Ottoman garrison's vacation of the fortress on penalty of execution by impalement. The garrison left the next day with its baggage.

Aftermath
The last strongpoint on the road to Buda had been taken. The next action would be the Battle of Vác on 27 June.

References

Bibliography 

 

Battles of the Great Turkish War
Battles involving the Ottoman Empire
Battles involving the Holy Roman Empire
Conflicts in 1684
1684 in Europe